Historic Ships in Baltimore, created as a result of the merger of the USS Constellation Museum and the Baltimore Maritime Museum, is a maritime museum located in the  Inner Harbor of Baltimore, Maryland in the United States.

The museum's collection includes four historic museum ships and one lighthouse:

 USS Constellation, a sloop-of-war; the last sail-only warship designed and built by the United States Navy
 WHEC-37, a Coast Guard cutter; the last surviving vessel that participated in the attack on Pearl Harbor
 USS Torsk (SS-423), a World War II-era submarine; credited with the last sinking of an enemy ship by the USN in that war
 Chesapeake (LV-116), a lightship; stationed at the entrance to the Chesapeake Bay for most of her 40-year service life
 Seven Foot Knoll Light, a screw-pile lighthouse

All are listed on the National Register of Historic Places.  The four ships are also National Historic Landmarks.

The Liberty ship SS John W. Brown is also homeported out of Baltimore.

Historic Ships in Baltimore is an affiliate of the Living Classrooms Foundation.

See also
  List of maritime museums in the United States
  List of museum ships

References

External links
 
 Historic Ships in Baltimore homepage
 Torsk Volunteer Association
 Maritime Museum on Google Street View

Museums in Baltimore
Maritime museums in Maryland
Baltimore National Heritage Area
Inner Harbor, Baltimore